Heroes of Fort Worth or Gli eroi di Fort Worth is a 1965 Italian Spaghetti Western film directed by Alberto De Martino.

Story
After the Civil War a band of Southerners with the aid of an Indian tribe, try to defeat a Union command while trying to gain support from Emperor Maximillian.

Cast

External links
 
 Heroes of Fort Worth at Variety Distribution

1965 films
1960s Italian-language films
1965 Western (genre) films
Spaghetti Western films
Italian Western (genre) films
Films directed by Alberto De Martino
Films scored by Carlo Rustichelli
Second French intervention in Mexico films
Films set in Mexico
1960s Italian films